Kalidou is a given name. Notable people with the name include:

Kalidou Cissokho (born 1978), Senegalese footballer
Kalidou Koulibaly (born 1991), Senegalese footballer
Kalidou Sidibé (born 1999), French footballer
Kalidou Yero (born 1991), Senegalese footballer

African given names